The Golden Gloves in British Columbia, Canada has been a key amateur boxing tournament since its inception in 1939. The debut Golden Gloves champions in 1939 were Wayne Morris, Alan Dunn, Phil Vickery, Erick Burnell, Bob Hickey, Henry Devine and Kenny Lindsay. The first Golden Boy was Phil Vickery.

The Sun Golden Gloves
Following promotion of amateur boxing in 1938, the executive of the BC Amateur Boxing Association believed it was time to start a Golden Gloves tournament. The Vancouver Sun newspaper accepted the sponsorship for the province of British Columbia. The first tournament took place in 1939.

Some of the Golden Gloves Alumni (boxers) from 1939 to 2010 were:
 Gordon Grayson - Royal Canadian Navy heavyweight boxer
 Bobby Parker - 1940s boxer
 Tommy Symes - 1940s boxer
 Chester Orr - 1945 Golden Boy
 Art Burgess - Victoria boxer in 1946 Golden Gloves
 Everett Biggs - Alberni boxer 1946 Golden Gloves
 Eddie Haddad - 1947
 Harold Mann - 1958
 Jack Straza - 1959 Golden Boy
 Skimp Williams - two special awards in 1960
 Alan Curtis - 1960 Golden Boy
 Mike Caird - 1960 and 1963
 Freddy Fuller - 1965
 Bob Kacer - 1966 Tacoma Golden Gloves featherweight champion
 Brian Zelley - 1967 and 1968
 Dave Wylie: 1967 Diamond Boy
 Ray Lampkin - 1968 Golden Boy
 Neil Knight - 1969 Golden Boy
 Buzz Montour - 1970 Golden Boy
 Garry Serko - 1983 and 1985 Golden Gloves Champion, 1985 runner-up Golden Boy and 1985 Provincial Champion
 Manny Sobral - 1986
 Geronimo Bie - 1988
 Jack Meda
 Dick Findlay Dick Findlay - 1966 and 1967 BC Golden Boy and 1968 Olympic boxer
 Chris Ius Chris Ius - 1972 and 1976 Olympic boxer
 Leslie Hamilton - 1972 Olympic boxer
 Gordie Lawson - scored the only knockout in the 1975 BC Golden Gloves
 Wayne Crowe - 1976
 Danny O'Sullivan - 1976
 Dale Walters - 1984 Olympic bronze medal
 Sidney McKnight - 1976 Olympic boxer
 Frank Albert Scott - 1966 Commonwealth Games bronze medal
 Randy Elson - three time Junior Golden Boy
 Clary Poitras - 2006 Heavyweight Champ
 Shane Knox - 2006 BC Golden Boy
 Oliver Enns - 2008 BC Golden Boy
 Dylan Bishop - 2010 BC Golden Boy

1946 Golden Gloves
The tournament was sponsored by The Vancouver Sun, and was held February 14 and 15, 1946 at the Hastings Park Forum, Vancouver, BC.

Some of the boxers highlighted in the official program were Jimmy Crook, Lyle Kehoe, Ken McPhee, Terry Doyle, coach Tommy Gann, Vic Murdoch, coach Russ Gatake, coach Len Gervais, Jackie Tuner, Freddy Steele, Roddy MacDonald, referee Ernie Brown, Jack Herwynen and world champion Barney Ross.

A special section of the official program included names of some of the past British Columbia boxers that were in previous Seattle Golden Glove tournaments between 1942 and 1945: Gordon Grayson, Robert Hickie, Tommy Symes, Jackie Turner, Joe Ashenbrenner, Hank Egli, Roy Burnell, Bert Lepitre, Freddy Steele, Bobby Parker, Vic Murdoch, and Lyle Keho.

1960 BC Golden Gloves
Following the competition, the boxer selected as the Golden Boy was Victoria boxer Alan Curtis.

1961 BC Golden Gloves
The Golden Boy for 1961 was Bill "Curly" Adams.

1967 BC Golden Gloves
The Golden Boy for the second year in a row was Dick Findlay.

Preliminary bout boxers

From the newspaper files, the results were published in a February issue of the Vancouver Sun.

Boxers
Jack Straza, Orlan Ralph, Leo Chabot, Stephen Flajole, Cliff Belcourt, Bob Kacer, Wayne Boyce, Ken Henderson, Brian Zelley, Vern Fouth, Del Deugau, Danny Gontes, Ron White, Fred Fuller, Dave Wylie, Steve Tohill, Pete Salgot, Pat O'Reilly, Jim Dixon, Lennie Erdmann, Kevin Jones,  Fred Desrosiers,  Toby Crook, Colin Coleridge, George Perez, Denis Rorick, Ken Egan, Gord Sinclair, Kelly Adams, Ron Wilson, George Smith, Ken Tommy, Howard Hewitt, Glenn McGee, Terry Eastman, Marion Kolar, Richard Fleck, Ken Alexander, Ed Ostapovich, John Kirk, George Van Nockay, Roy Smith, Jack Meda, Bill Taylor.

Champions and finalists

Derek Austin, Randy Jones, Ray Lampkin, Frank Scott,  Brian Zelley, Dick Coulson, Philip King, Dick Findlay, Freddy Fuller, Lennie Erdmann, Steve Tohill, Gordon Sinclair, Colin Coleridge, Ron Manson, Ron Wilson, Ken Tommy, Marion Kolar, Wes Craven and Jack Meda

1968 BC Golden Gloves
The 1968 BC Golden took place in Vancouver, BC at the PNE Garden Auditorium.

The semi-final action winners were Derek Austin of Langley, Dave Johnson and Dave Allerdice of North West Eagles, Brian Zelley, Frank Scott, John Carr of Vancouver Firefighters, Laurie Rorick of Prince George, Billy Taylor, and Rick Fleck.

Championship bouts
The final champions were John Howard, Mike Colbert and Ray Lampkin of Portland, Oregon, Joe Cooke and Dave Allerdice of the North West Eagles, Derek Austin, Frank Scott, George Perez of Othello, Washington, Billy Taylor and Dick Findlay of the East Vancouver Optimists.

The Golden Boy for 1968 was Ray Lampkin, and the 1966 and 1967 BC Golden Boy Dick Findlay was Golden Boy runner-up.

Ray Lampkin
Ray Lampkin, the 1968 BC Golden Boy, would turn professional and become a top ranked lightweight boxer. In 1975, he was considered the United States lightweight champion. In world rankings in July 1975, Lampkin was the number one contender for the lightweight title held by Panama boxer Roberto Duran.

1984 BC Golden Gloves
The tournament took place in January 1984 in Burnaby at the Boxing BC Training centre, which would also be used as a training camp for the 1984 and 1988 Canadian Olympic boxing teams.

At the end of the tournament the Golden Boy for 1984 was boxer Michael O'Connell and the runner-up was Joe Pendry, and the best youth boxer was Deep Butter.

Ring officials
Bert Lowes, Fred Fuller, Rudy Bianco, Sid Knopp Vic Murdoch, Larry Carney, Earl Vance, Jack Mellor, Larry Krangle, Brian Zelley, Rick Brough and Bob Newbrook.

Announcer: Joe Swift. Glovers: Tommy Yule and Gordon Miller.

Champions and finalists
 Bassam Batrani, Scott Bannink, Jamie Ballard, Gary Wood, Dale Walters, Scott Cessford, Joe Pendry, Ken Smith, Alex Angelomatis, Tim Howie, Leon Chambers, Dan Zaleski, Lee Gauthier, John Wilson George Pires, Derek Wolfe, Deep Butter, Willie Curry, Michael O'Connell, Kika Singh, Al Harper, Garry Serko, Cody Redford, Joe Martin and Tom Coady.

2012 BC Golden Gloves and other tournaments
The 2012 BC Golden Gloves were scheduled to take place in Vernon, BC in April. The 2012 Silver Gloves were scheduled to be hosted by the Mission City Boxing Club in June 2012.

The Silver Gloves has a history that begins in 1943 due to the efforts of Val Roach. In 1960, the tournament was hosted by the South Burnaby boxing club under the direction of Harry Twist. From 1961 to 1967 the tournament remained inactive until a revival in 1968 in Richmond, BC.

References

Sources
 Brian W. Zelley, former editor BC Amateur Boxing News, 1984 BC Amateur Boxing News Annual
 Ring records of Frederick Stephen Fuller, and Boxing BC
 Boxing records of Bert Lowes,  Mike Caird and Tommy Paonessa
The Paonessa records are courtesy of John Paonessa
 Boxing records of Gordie Lawson, former amateur and professional boxer
 Boxing records of Howard Curling, former Vancouver Island Amateur Boxing Commissioner and ring official
 For 2012, the sources include Boxing BC and the host clubs.

Boxing in Canada
Golden Gloves
Amateur boxing